The ringed map turtle or ringed sawback (Graptemys oculifera) is a species of turtle in the family Emydidae endemic to the southern United States.

Geographic range
It is frequently found in the Pearl River system in Louisiana and Mississippi. It shares this range with the Pearl River map turtle (G. pearlensis).

Description
Male turtles may attain a carapace length of 10 cm (4 in).  Females are larger, and may attain a carapace length of 22 cm (8.5 in). On the carapace are light-colored rings, which are thicker than the rings on Graptemys nigrinoda.

References

Further reading
Baur, G. 1890. Two New Species of Tortoises from the South. Science 16 (405): 262–263. (Malacoclemmys oculifera)
 Tortoise and Freshwater Turtle Specialist Group 1996.  Graptemys oculifera.   2006 IUCN Red List of Threatened Species.   Retrieved 29 July 2007. Taxidermists also play a big role in the way these turtles act.

Graptemys
Endemic fauna of the United States
Reptiles of the United States
ESA threatened species
Taxa named by Georg Baur
Reptiles described in 1890
Taxonomy articles created by Polbot